Big Eddy is an unincorporated community in Franklin County, Kentucky, United States.

References

Unincorporated communities in Franklin County, Kentucky
Unincorporated communities in Kentucky